Chornomorske is an urban-type settlement in Odesa Oblast  of Ukraine. Before 1978 it was known as Hvardiyske village. The 28th Mechanized Brigade is stationed in the settlement.

References

Urban-type settlements in Odesa Raion